An assassin's mace is a legendary ancient Chinese weapon. The term has its roots in ancient Chinese folklore, which recounts how a hero wielding such a weapon managed to overcome a far more powerful adversary. "Shashou Jian" was a club with which the assassin incapacitated his enemy, suddenly and totally, instead of fighting him according to the rules. According to many military analysts, the term is now used in China to describe a specific type of military system that demonstrates asymmetrical warfare and anti-access/area denial capabilities to counter the United States, though whether "assassin's mace" refers to a defined class of weapons or is merely used in the Chinese government to describe these weapons is disputed.

Etymology and origin 
The term "shashoujian" is composed of three characters that literally mean "kill", "hand", and "mace", and can be interpreted in multiple different ways when translated to English, with the Foreign Broadcast Information Service using over 15 different translations from 1996 to 2005. Typically, "shashoujian" is rendered in English as "assassin's mace", where the two character compound "shashou" is interpreted as "assassin" and "jian" is interpreted as "mace". However, the term can also be translated as "killing mace", as the term "shoujian" refers to a small hand mace used in ancient China to kill heavily armoured enemies. The definite origin of the combined term shashoujian is elusive, but has its roots in Chinese folklore where the term is typically used to describe a secret weapon of surprising power used to overcome a more powerful adversary.

Modern usage 
While the term as a figure of speech has been around for centuries and has been revived in contemporary Chinese pop culture, one of the main disputes is on its usage in a modern military context. The term is frequently used in Chinese military contexts to describe new weapons systems, and many American military analysts interpret this as referring to a new class or type of weapon developed by China. Other writers dispute this characterization, with critics of the term's usage have called it a popular expression roughly equivalent to the English idioms "silver bullet" or "trump card", and means anything which ensures success.

Application to military systems 

Proponents of the term "assassin's mace" to describe Chinese military development say that the Chinese government uses the term to describe a group of technologies or strategies that are specifically designed to counter the United States and displace it as a world power. Scholar Rush Doshi suggests that People's Liberation Army strategists developed the concept of these weapons after the United States proved its conventional superiority to Iraq in the Gulf War, and that fulfilling the concept necessitated the development of the People's Liberation Army Navy Submarine Force, sea mines, and anti-ship ballistic missiles. Analysts also describe "assassin's mace" as being specifically focused on asymmetrical warfare and anti-access/area denial tactics.

Submarines 
American analysts agree that submarines are a key component of assassin's mace weaponry, but propose different reasons for how they fit into that paradigm. Doshi describes assassin's mace submarines as those that can attack American carrier battle groups using anti-ship missiles and sea mines, while being weak in land-attack capabilities. In Doshi's view, the assassin's mace concept requires China's navy to use a mix of diesel electric and nuclear submarines in contrast to the American policy of only using nuclear submarines. Doshi proposes that China chose to incorporate diesel-electric submarines into their fleet as an asymmetrical weapon because they are cheaper and quieter than the nuclear submarines used by the United States. While diesel-electric submarines do not have the range of a nuclear submarine, this would be an acceptable trade-off in a conflict close to Chinese territory where the submarines are used to deny American access to the Asia-Pacific region.

To contrast, Jason Bruzdzinski, a director at the Mitre Corporation, describes nuclear ballistic missile submarines as being "the shashoujian of the Chinese navy". Bruzdzinski's view is that such a submarine would be stealthy and have a large range, meaning that it would be resistant against pre-emptive strikes and serve as a nuclear deterrent. Bruzdzinski says that Chinese analysts view the threat of nuclear weapons as being able to deter a technologically superior force such as the United States from entering into a conflict with China.

Sea mines 
American analysts consider sea mines as being a core part of "assassin's mace" as they are able to cost-effectively deny access to an area. According to Andrew S. Erickson, professor at the American Naval War College, Chinese military strategists describe sea mines as "easy to lay and difficult to sweep" and label sea mines as "assassin's mace" weaponry, having invested significant resources into developing them. Chinese military analysts have also said that attacks utilizing sea mines against the USS Tripoli and USS Princeton during the Gulf War demonstrated significant vulnerability of American ships to this type of weaponry.

Missiles  
Anti-ship ballistic missiles (ASBMs) are considered by Doshi and Chinese government sources to be another major assassin's mace weapon. The Science of Second Artillery Campaigns, a textbook published by what is now known as the People's Liberation Army Rocket Force, says that ASBMs should be used as "assassin's mace" weapons for "deterring and blocking enemy carrier groups". Doshi points to Chinese analyst Dong Lu, who summarized the Chinese viewpoint on ASBMs:

See also 

 Asymmetric warfare
Unrestricted Warfare

References

Chinese folklore
Chinese words and phrases
Military strategy
People's Liberation Army